Convict Stage is a 1965 American Western film directed by Lesley Selander and written by Daniel Mainwaring. The film stars Harry Lauter, Don "Red" Barry, Jodi Mitchell, Hanna Landy, Joe Patridge and Eric Matthews. The film was released on June 17, 1965, by 20th Century Fox.

Plot
When inept bandits the Simes Brothers kill his sister during a stagecoach robbery, gunfighter Ben Lattimore vows vengeance. When he learns that an old lawman has captured them, he considers shooting them but then decides to ride along to prevent rescue by their fellow gang members, who are still on the loose. But neither Ben nor lawman Jethro Karnin are aware that Ma Simes is also a passenger on the stagecoach . . .

Cast 
Harry Lauter as Ben Lattimore
Don "Red" Barry as Marshall Jethro Karnin
Jodi Mitchell as Sally Latttimore
Hanna Landy as Mrs. Gregory
Joe Patridge as Jeb Sims
Eric Matthews as Johnny Sims
Walter Reed as Sam Gill
Michael Carr as Piute
Fred Krone as Dixon
George Sawaya as Adam Scott
Karl MacDonald as Bates

See also
List of American films of 1965

References

External links 
 

1965 films
1960s English-language films
20th Century Fox films
American Western (genre) films
1965 Western (genre) films
Films directed by Lesley Selander
Films scored by Richard LaSalle
1960s American films